University of Shanghai, also known as Shanghai College and Hujiang University, was a university established by the American Baptist Missionary Union and the Southern Baptist Convention in Shanghai.

It was the predecessor of University of Shanghai for Science and Technology.

History

During the Boxer Rebellion in 1900, the Central China Mission of the American Southern Baptist Convention and the East China Mission of the American Baptist Missionary Union (Northern Baptists) gathered in Shanghai. The two missions collaborated for higher education, establishing the Shanghai Baptist Theological Seminary in 1906 and Shanghai Baptist College in 1909. The two were combined in 1911 to form "Shanghai Baptist College and Theological Seminary". The name "University of Shanghai" (滬江大學) was adopted when it was registered with the Chinese Government in 1929.

Liu Zhan'en (or Herman Chan-En Liu), an alumnus of Teachers College, Columbia University, was the first Chinese president to succeed Dr. F·J·White for the university.

University of Shanghai was in a critical position for information sharing after the 1937' Battle of Nanking. President Liu was assassinated by the Japanese on a bus stop in Shanghai on the date of April 7, 1938 after he secretly transferred Nanjing Massacre photos (taken by western missionary people) to the members of public along the world.

Ling, Hsien-yang (prefers Henry H. Lin), an alumnus of University of Shanghai (1927) and University of Southern California (1929), was the last Chinese president for the university. He selected to remain in mainland China for servicing the school and students in 1949. He was imprisoned in 1951 on the Campaign to Suppress Counterrevolutionaries and died few years later.

In 1952
University of Shanghai was merged into East China Normal University and other universities in Shanghai.  It is no longer existing. 
Some university records for research purpose are available in the Yale University's Divinity School Library.

Building 
In 1919,  the campus was designed by the American architect Henry Murphy's company.

See also
 University of Shanghai for Science and Technology

References

Defunct universities and colleges in Shanghai
1906 establishments in China
1952 disestablishments in China
Christian colleges in China